The following lists events that happened during 1936 in Chile.

Incumbents
President of Chile: Arturo Alessandri

Events

August
1–16 August – Chile at the 1936 Summer Olympics

Births 
31 January – Gabriel Salazar
7 February – Luis Santibáñez (d. 2008)
20 February – Sergio Navarro
25 April – Leonel Sánchez
27 June – Ricardo Ffrench-Davis
8 November – Claudio Bravo (painter) (d. 2011)
26 November – Adán Godoy
4 December – Alicia Galaz Vivar (d. 2003)

Deaths
date unknown -Luis Matte
17 August – Gonzalo Bulnes

References 

 
Years of the 20th century in Chile
Chile